= Surbaugh, West Virginia =

- Unincorporated community
- Location within West Virginia Location within the United States
- Coordinates: 38°00′52″N 80°47′43″W
- Country: United States
- State: West Virginia
- County: Fayette
- Elevation: 2,379 ft (725 m)
- Time zone: UTC-5 (Eastern (EST))
  - Summer (DST): UTC-4 (EDT)
- GNIS ID: 1555760

Surbaugh is an unincorporated community in Fayette County, West Virginia, United States.
